Sher-e-Kashmir University of Agricultural Sciences and Technology of Jammu (SKUAST-J) is a state agricultural university of Jammu division of the Jammu and Kashmir. SKUAST-J came into existence on 20 September 1999 following the amendment in Sher-e-Kashmir University of Agricultural Sciences and Technology Act 1982 through the State legislature. The university inherited few assets and staff deployed at various stations and sub-stations from erstwhile SKUAST (J&K) to carry on the mission of agriculture research and development. Currently, the main campus of the university, Faculty of Agriculture and Faculty of Basic Sciences is located at Chatha, Jammu. The Faculty of Veterinary Sciences and Animal Husbandry (F.V.Sc & A.H) is located at R. S. Pura, Jammu.

History
The Sher-e-Kashmir University of Agricultural Sciences and Technology,  J & K was established in 1982 with the objectives of catering to the research, education and extension education requirements of the state. The entire educational infrastructure like colleges of Agriculture, Veterinary and Forestry came up in Kashmir province only and major infrastructure for research and extension was also developed in the same region.

Subsequently, demand for the establishment of a separate Agriculture University for Jammu region was desired because the Jammu region is different from the Kashmir division with regard to its livestock, type and pattern of cropping and other factors. The problems of Jammu region are location-specific in research on crops, pulses, fruits, oil-seeds, vegetables, agriculture, species of livestock and poultry.

Keeping these considerations in view, the then Prime Minister of India, Sh. H.D. Deve Gowda, during his visit to Jammu in 1996, announced the establishment of a separate Agricultural University for Jammu region. His successor-in-office,  Sh. I. K. Gujral, subsequently reiterated this commitment.

Following these announcements, the Indian Council of Agricultural Research (ICAR) constituted a committee popularly known as the Madan Committee. The Committee recommended, in principle, the establishment of the separate Agricultural University for Jammu. Accordingly, the Sher-e-Kashmir University of Agricultural Sciences & Technology Act of 1982 was amended by the State legislature providing for a separate Agricultural University by the same name (SKUAST of Jammu).

Research stations, substations, and centres

 Regional Agricultural Research Station, Rajouri
 Dryland Research Sub-station, Dhiansar
 Rain fed Research Sub-station for tropical Fruits, Raya
 Regional Horticulture Research Sub-station, Bhaderwah
 Pulses Research Sub-station, Samba
 Maize Breeding Research Sub-station, Poonch
 Water Management Research Centre, Chatha
 Cropping System Research, Chatha
 Seed Production Farm, Chakroi, RS Pura
 All India Maize Improvement Project, Udhampur

References

External links

Agricultural universities and colleges in India
Education in Jammu (city)
Universities in Jammu and Kashmir
Agriculture in Jammu and Kashmir